Codonocarpus cotinifolius a tall shrub or tree in the Gyrostemonaceae family is a found in all mainland states of Australia, including Victoria, and is widespread in arid areas. It is suspected of being toxic to stock.

Common names are native poplar (New South Wales, Western Australia), and bell-fruit tree (Victoria)

The species was first described in 1822  as Gyrostemon cotinifolium by René Louiche Desfontaines. In 1862 Ferdinand von Mueller transferred it to the genus, Codonocarpus.

Conservation status 
In the Northern Territory and in Queensland the conservation status is of "least concern".

Gallery

References

External links 
 Codonocarpus cotinifolius occurrence data from the Australasian Virtual Herbarium

Gyrostemonaceae
Plants described in 1822
Taxa named by René Louiche Desfontaines
Flora of Australia